is a former Japanese football player.

Playing career
Ueno was born in Muroran on May 31, 1981. After graduating from high school, he joined J1 League club Kyoto Purple Sanga (later Kyoto Sanga FC) in 2000. However he could hardly play in the match behind Shigetatsu Matsunaga and Naohito Hirai. In June 2004, he moved to Sanfrecce Hiroshima on loan. However he could not play at all in the match behind Takashi Shimoda until 2005. In 2006, he returned to Kyoto. In 2007, he played as regular goalkeeper until May in J2 League. However he could hardly play in the match after that. In 2009, he moved to J2 club Tokushima Vortis. In 2009, he played full time in all 51 matches. However his opportunity to play decreased in 2010 and he could not play at all in the match in 2011. He retired end of 2011 season.

Club statistics

References

External links

1981 births
Living people
Association football people from Hokkaido
Japanese footballers
J1 League players
J2 League players
Kyoto Sanga FC players
Sanfrecce Hiroshima players
Tokushima Vortis players
Association football goalkeepers
People from Muroran, Hokkaido